Nazim Belkhodja (born 1 February 1990) is an Algerian swimmer. He competed in the men's 50 metre butterfly event at the 2017 World Aquatics Championships. He also competed at the 2015 African Games.

References

External links
 

1990 births
Living people
Algerian male swimmers
Place of birth missing (living people)
Male butterfly swimmers
Swimmers at the 2015 African Games
African Games competitors for Algeria
African Games medalists in swimming
21st-century Algerian people
African Games bronze medalists for Algeria